Doss Consolidated Common School District is a public school district based in the community of Doss, Texas (USA).

It has a single school, The Doss School, which began its existence in 1884.

Located in Gillespie County, a small portion of the district extends into Mason County.

In 2009, the school district was rated "exemplary" by the Texas Education Agency.

References

School districts in Gillespie County, Texas
School districts in Mason County, Texas
1884 establishments in Texas
School districts established in 1884